Kasia Mychajlowycz is a journalist and podcaster who hosted Canadaland's Cool Mules 2020 podcast.

Education 
Mychajlowycz has an master's of arts degree from the School of Journalism at Ryerson University and is a graduate of the University of Toronto School of Journalism. In Winter 2012, Mychajlowycz was the online story editor for Ryerson Review of Journalism.

Career 
Mychajlowycz joined Canadaland in May 2019 and worked as a senior producer. In January 2021, Broadcast Dialogue announced she was moving to The Globe & Mail as a senior podcast producer. Mychajlowycz has previously worked in Canada and the United States in as a producer at MTV, The Atlantic, and at WNYC. She has also worked on the Freakonomics Podcasts.

In 2021, Mychajlowycz won the University of Toronto School of Journalism's Best Podcast: Arts and Culture and a two honourable mentions her work on the Canadaland podcast and The White Saviors podcast. Also in 2021, she won Gold - Best Podcast: Arts & Culture for her work on the Cool Mules podcast and honourable mentions for her work on The White Saviors at the Digital Publishing Awards, a National Media Awards Foundation event. In 2022, she won an honourable mention for her work on the Canadaland podcast at the Digital Publishing Awards.

Selected publications 

 Ivor Shapiro, Colette Brin, Isabelle Bédard-Brûlé & Kasia Mychajlowycz (2013) Verification as a Strategic Ritual, Journalism Practice, 7:6, 657-673, DOI: 10.1080/17512786.2013.765638

Personal life 
In 2014, Mychajlowycz wrote an open letter to Sinead O'Connor, critiquing her open letter to Miley Cyrus.

References

External link 
 Mychajlowycz's open letter to Sinead O'Connor

Year of birth missing (living people)
Living people
21st-century Canadian journalists
Canadian women podcasters
Canadian producers
Toronto Metropolitan University alumni
University of Toronto alumni
The Globe and Mail people